Likou Aliu (born 20 May 1962) is a Samoan boxer. He competed at the 1988 Summer Olympics and the 1992 Summer Olympics.

References

External links

1962 births
Living people
Samoan male boxers
Olympic boxers of Samoa
Boxers at the 1988 Summer Olympics
Boxers at the 1992 Summer Olympics
Place of birth missing (living people)
Light-middleweight boxers